The Nae Nae is a hip-hop dance that involves placing one arm in the air and swaying from side to side. The Atlanta hip hop group We Are Toonz is credited for inventing the phrase with their hit song "Drop That NaeNae" in 2013. The dance was based on a character from the 1990s sitcom Martin. In the series, Martin Lawrence cross-dressed to play Sheneneh Jenkins, an exaggerated, sassy “ghetto girl”. The group member Callamar stated in an interview with Billboard, “It’s really just based on a ratchet girl in the club dancing kind of funny and the best girl to describe it is Sheneneh from Martin.” In one interview, Martin Lawrence stated he was “flattered” by the dance.

Throughout 2014, the song achieved widespread popularity on social media such as Vine, Twitter, Instagram, and YouTube. It has also been performed as a celebratory dance at collegiate and professional sporting events.

In 2015, American rapper Silentó released his debut single "Watch Me (Whip/Nae Nae)" which also included the Nae Nae along with other dance moves, appearing in viral videos and mainstream media.

Numerous celebrities have been covered by the social and mainstream media when they performed the dance, including Jeremy Lin and Stephen Curry, Dwight Howard, Lance Moore, TLC, John Wall, Pharrell Williams, Miley Cyrus, and J. J. Watt. The video game NBA 2K16 allows players to dance the Nae Nae. Fifth Harmony also mentioned the dance move in their song "BO$$".

Then-President of the United States Barack Obama publicly praised a Washington, D.C. police officer who did the dance with a teenager in October 2015.

2010s hip-hop dance trends 
Similar dance trends include:

 Hit dem folks
 Dab
 Juju on that beat
 Milly rock
 Hit the Quan

References

Novelty and fad dances
2013 introductions
2010s fads and trends
Hip hop dance